The 1995 Copa CONMEBOL was the fourth edition of CONMEBOL's annual club tournament. Teams that failed to qualify for the Copa Libertadores played in this tournament. Sixteen teams from the ten South American football confederations qualified for this tournament. Rosario Central defeated Atlético Mineiro in the finals.

Qualified teams

Bracket

First round

|}

Quarterfinals

|}

Semifinals

|}

Finals

|}

External links
CONMEBOL 1995 at RSSSF
CONMEBOL 1995 at CONMEBOL Official Website

Copa CONMEBOL
3